Molchat Doma is a Belarusian post-punk band from Minsk, formed in 2017. Their current lineup consists of Egor Shkutko (vocals), Roman Komogortsev (guitar, synthesizer, drum machine), and Pavel Kozlov (bass guitar, synthesizer). Their style is influenced by 1980s Russian rock music and has been described as post-punk, new wave, synth-pop, and cold wave.

They self-released their first album, S krysh nashikh domov in 2017 and later released their second album, Etazhi in 2018, through German independent label Detriti Records. After gaining popularity worldwide, they signed to American independent label Sacred Bones Records in 2020, who reissued their albums, marking their first releases in North America. Their third studio album, Monument, was released on 13 November 2020.

Currently, Molchat Doma has never sung in Belarusian. When asked about this, they simply replied that singing in Russian is "more comfortable" for them.

History

S krysh nashikh domov and Etazhi (2017–2019)

Molchat Doma formed in Minsk, Belarus, and began releasing music in 2017. They self-released their debut studio album, S krysh nashikh domov ('From The Roofs of Our Houses'), on 24 April 2017. In July 2017, they released the song Kommersanty (Коммерсанты, 'Businessmen') as a single. Later that year, S krysh nashikh domov received a re-release through German independent label Detriti Records. The following year, the band released their second album, Etazhi (Этажи, 'Floors'), which included Kommersanty, on 7 September 2018, also through Detriti. The label released the album both digitally and on vinyl.

Over time, the band's first two albums gained popularity through YouTube and Bandcamp. Their music was uploaded to YouTube unofficially by a user named "Harakiri Diat", who also uploaded music by other bands with similar sounds. By the end of 2019, Etazhi had gained roughly two million listeners through their upload of the album. The band were not initially as popular in their home country of Belarus as they were in the rest of Europe; they had played sold-out shows across the continent but never in Belarus. They have stated, however, that they have no interest in performing a sold-out show at Minsk-Arena. Later that year in September, the band released two singles. The first was called Zvezdy (Звезды, 'Stars') and the second was a collaboration with Russian post-punk band Ploho, called Po krayu ostrova (По краю острова, 'Along the Edge of the Island').

Signing with Sacred Bones Records and Monument (2020–present)

In January 2020, Molchat Doma signed with American independent label Sacred Bones Records, who later reissued their first two albums on vinyl in North America. During the first half of 2020, the band gained popularity through the online video platform TikTok, specifically their song Sudno (Boris Ryzhy) ('Bedpan (Boris Ryzhy)'), from Etazhi; the song had been used as the soundtrack to numerous videos created on the platform. Some notable videos that used the song include one made by a user based in San Francisco, California, who compiled several clips of his native country of Russia, adding that he misses being there, as well as a "challenge" that involves a fast photo compilation of the video creator trying on as many clothes in their wardrobe as possible within a time limit. The song's popularity during this time resulted in it reaching No. 2 on the Spotify worldwide Viral 50 chart.

Molchat Doma had planned to tour in North America for the first time, alongside American singer-songwriter Chrysta Bell, but the original tour dates were canceled once the COVID-19 pandemic had impacted the continent. The band contributed to a Black Sabbath tribute album, along with other signees of Sacred Bones, titled What Is This That Stands Before Me?. They covered their song "Heaven and Hell", with a dark wave sound and Russian lyrics, for the album. The album was released in May 2020, and their "Heaven and Hell" cover was released as a standalone single on digital platforms later that month.

On 15 September 2020, Molchat Doma announced their first album through Sacred Bones, titled Monument, and its release date of 13 November. Alongside the announcement was the release of the album's lead single, "Ne smeshno" (Не смешно, 'Not Funny').

In January 2023, a US show was announced: the band will play at the Cruel World Festival in Pasadena, California on May 20, 2023.

Members 
Egor Shkutko (Belarusian: Yahor Shkutko) – vocals
Roman Komogortsev (Raman Kamahortsau) – guitar, synthesizer, drum machine
Pavel Kozlov (Pavel Kazlou) – bass guitar, synthesizer

Musical style and lyrics

Molchat Doma have stated that they were influenced by 1980s Russian rock music from the Perestroika era, most notably the band Kino. They have also drawn comparisons to both the Cure and Joy Division; Egor Shkutko's vocal style and on-stage appearance were also noted as similar to that of Joy Division singer Ian Curtis. Pitchforks Cat Zhang described Shkutko's vocals as "spectral and disembodied", also pointing out that his "droning voice" is often "clouded in reverb". Molchat Doma have expressed praise for the Cure singer Robert Smith and Depeche Mode singer Dave Gahan, and enjoy the idea of having either one appear at one of their shows.

Molchat Doma described their sound as "post-punk, new wave, and darker ends of synth-pop". Writers have similarly described their sound as post-punk, new wave, synth-pop, and also cold wave. They have no drummer and instead incorporate a drum machine into their sound. Corporate intelligence firm and foreign investment think-tank Emerging Europe described their lyrics as "not explicitly anti-Soviet" but also "[painting] a bleak picture of life under communism as well as contemporary life in Belarus, a country still trying to break free of the shackles of its communist past", opining that "had they been around 40 years ago, Soviet state censorship would have denied the band the right to record". Molchat Doma have often been connected with "doomer music", a specific type of music listened to by doomers. It typically features cold and gloomy atmospheres, sad and introspective lyrics usually focusing on loneliness, and an overall dystopian sound, all of which writers have connected Molchat Doma's music to. Many of their songs have appeared on "doomer playlists" on YouTube as a result; this also played a part in the band gaining popularity through the platform.

Discography

Studio albums

Singles

Other charted songs

Remixes
Geometric Vision - "Slowemotion" (Molchat Doma Remix)
Antipole - "Marble" feat. Paris Alexander (Molchat Doma Remix)
Ash Code - "Fear" (Molchat Doma Remix)

References
Notes

References

External links

Musical groups established in 2017
2017 establishments in Belarus
Belarusian rock music groups
Cold wave groups
New wave groups
Synthpop groups
Musical trios